Alma grande ("Great Soul") is a 1966 Mexican film. It was directed by Chano Urueta. The picture is based on the eponymous western comics series Alma Grande (1961-1973)  by Pedro Zapiain and José Suarez Lozano.

Sources

External links
 

1966 films
1966 Western (genre) films
Mexican Western (genre) films
1960s Spanish-language films
Films directed by Chano Urueta
Live-action films based on comics
Films based on Mexican comics
1960s Mexican films